National Open University (NOU) is an open university in Luzhou District, New Taipei, Taiwan.

NOU is a distance learning university that provides accessible education to Nigerians and students in some African countries.

The university offers undergraduate, postgraduate and professional courses in various fields of study such as Arts, Management Sciences, Education, Health Sciences, Law, Agriculture, and Social Sciences.

History
National Open University was established on 1 August 1986. The opening ceremony and first year courses started in November 1986. Although the university originally had entrance examinations, they were later abolished in 1997. Classes were originally conducted over a dedicated radio station, and television channel and internet classroom were later added. Today, the university is a full-service, distance learning university fully accredited by the Taiwanese government, and has an annual enrollment of 35,000 students.

Faculties
National Open University is headed by a president. The University contain six academic departments.
Department of Business
Department of Liberal Arts
Department of Living Sciences
Department of Management and Information
Department of Public Administration
Department of Social Sciences

Alumni
 Chen Fu-hai, Magistrate of Kinmen County
 Wang Chien-fa, Magistrate of Penghu County (2005–2014)

Transportation
NOU is accessible within walking distance South East from Luzhou Station of Taipei Metro.

See also
 List of universities in Taiwan
List of open universities

References

External links

 

Distance education institutions based in Taiwan
Alternative education
Open universities
Universities and colleges in New Taipei
Educational institutions established in 1986
1986 establishments in Taiwan
Universities and colleges in Taiwan